Lucien Zins (14 September 1922 – 13 December 2002) was a French swimmer. He competed at the 1948 Summer Olympics and the 1952 Summer Olympics.

References

External links
 

1922 births
2002 deaths
French male backstroke swimmers
Olympic swimmers of France
Swimmers at the 1948 Summer Olympics
Swimmers at the 1952 Summer Olympics
Sportspeople from Troyes